Fred Gamble (born Fred Alvin Gambold, October 26, 1868 – February 17, 1939) was an American film actor. He appeared in more than 130 films between 1913 and 1928. He was sometimes billed as Fred Gambold.

Biography
Gamble was born in Indianapolis, Indiana. At age 15, he left his home to join a minstrel show, beginning his career as an entertainer. He performed in vaudeville as a member of the Queen City Four and acted in stock theater. In 1912 he became a part of the American Film Company.

On February 17, 1939, Gamble died in Hollywood, California, at 70.

Partial filmography

 Susie's New Shoes (1914)
 A Broadway Scandal (1918)
 The Woman Under Cover (1919)
 Homespun Folks (1920)
 The Screaming Shadow (1920)
 Bullet Proof (1920)
 Love Never Dies (1921)
 Golf (1922)
 Boy Crazy (1922)
 The Firebrand (1922)
 Black Oxen (1923)
 The Tornado (1924)
 A Woman of the World (1925)
 Tumbleweeds (1925)
 Tonio, Son of the Sierras (1925)
 Chasing Trouble (1926)
 Born to Battle (1926)
 The Blackbird (1926)
 The Red Mill (1927)
 The Fighting Stallion (1927)
 Laddie Be Good (1928)

References

External links

1868 births
1939 deaths
American male film actors
American male silent film actors
20th-century American male actors
Male actors from Indiana
Vaudeville performers
American male stage actors